Jon de Burgh Miller is an author most associated with his work on a variety of spin-offs from the BBC Television series Doctor Who. He is also co-owner of and regular reviewer on the Shiny Shelf website.

Work

Miller's first published fiction was the Virgin Publishing Bernice Summerfield novel Twilight of the Gods, which was the final book of the series. He was brought on to the project by co-writer Mark Clapham, a friend from when both attended University College London. Following this, his Past Doctor Adventure Dying in the Sun was published by BBC Books in 2001.

He has also written the novella Deus Le Volt for Telos Publishing Ltd.'s Time Hunter series, published in 2006.

External links
 Outpost Gallifrey's Jon de Burgh Miller's page
 Shiny Shelf webpage

English science fiction writers
English short story writers
21st-century English novelists
Year of birth missing (living people)
Living people
Alumni of University College London
English male short story writers
English male novelists
21st-century British short story writers
21st-century English male writers
English male non-fiction writers